Lomnička (German: Klein Lomnitz) is a village and municipality in Stará Ľubovňa District in the Prešov Region of northern Slovakia. Till 1945 the name was KleinLomnitz for 'Small'Lomnitz.

History
In historical records the village was first mentioned in 1294. The population was mostly German speaking till August 1944.

Geography
The municipality lies at an altitude of 615 metres and covers an area of 9.568 km2. It has a population of about 3380 people, all Romani.

Sons and daughters of the town
 Michael Roth (born 1936), German engineer

References

Villages and municipalities in Stará Ľubovňa District
Romani communities in Slovakia